Zia Road is a station on the New Mexico Rail Runner Express commuter rail line, located in Santa Fe, New Mexico. The station is the first Rail Runner stop to be constructed on private land. Officials had scheduled it to open in August 2011, following an agreement from the city's finance committee that the stop will open if the owners construct parking and transit facilities for the station and the station opened in April 2017.

The station is located at the intersection of Zia Road & St. Francis Drive, and is planned to be the center of a mixed-use, transit-oriented development.

Each of the Rail Runner stations contains an icon to express each community's identity. The icon representing this station is the Cathedral Basilica of St. Francis of Assisi.

NMDOT announced in 2013 that they were waiting to complete a traffic study before starting parking lot construction, and potential designation for mixed-use development. However, Santa Fe City Council had indicated back in 2011 that although the land may be mixed use development, the station itself would be a Kiss-n-Ride station, meaning there will be no dedicated Rail Runner parking spots. In February 2015, The Santa Fe Metropolitan Planning Organization completed tests of trains stopping at the station and the impact of the surrounding area.

Recent developments

In May 2016, the New Mexico Department of Transportation approved construction plans for infrastructure needed to create a passenger pick-up and drop-off area for the station, including an access road, sidewalks, and lighting. As of August 2016, construction permits had been issued to the developer responsible for the site, allowing the start of construction of the passenger pick-up and drop-off area. As of September 2016, construction at the site was temporarily altering traffic flow at a nearby intersection, of West Zia Road and Galisteo Road, through temporary lane changes.

In January 2017, the New Mexico Department of Transportation issued a letter deeming improvements made by the city to be acceptable, and authorizing the station to open. At that time, the opening of the station was expected to occur "as early as late March, following a public comment period." It was announced in March 2017 that the station would be opening on the 24th of April.

References

External links
Stations, Zia Road Official Rail Runner site

Railway stations in New Mexico
Railway stations in the United States opened in 2017
Buildings and structures in Santa Fe, New Mexico
Transportation in Santa Fe County, New Mexico